This is a list of finance ministers of Eswatini since the formation of the post to present day.

List of officeholders
Leo Lovell, 1967 – 1972
Robert P. Stephens, June 1972 – January 1979
James Lawrence Funwako Simelane, January 1979 – November 1983
Sishayi Nxumalo, November 1983 – June 1984
Barnabas Sibusiso Dlamini, August 1984 – November 1993
Solomon Dlamini, 1993
Isaac Shabangu, November 1993 – March 1995
Derek von Wissel, March 1995 – November 1996
Themba N. Masuku, November 1996 – November 1998
John Philip Carmichael, November 1998 – February 2001
Majozi Sithole, February 2001 – 2013
Martin Dlamini, 2013 – 2018
Neal Rijkenberg, November 2018 –

See also
Economy of Eswatini
Central Bank of Eswatini

References

Politics of Eswatini
Government of Eswatini

1967 establishments in Swaziland
Politicians